Sarab-e Sar Firuzabad (also Romanized as Sarāb-e Sar Fīrūzābād; also known as Sarāb, Sarāb-e Fīrūzābād, Sarāb-e Soflá, Sar-e Fīrūzābād, and Sar-i-Āb-i-Fīrūzābād) is a village in Sar Firuzabad Rural District, Firuzabad District, Kermanshah County, Kermanshah Province, Iran. At the 2006 census, its population was 941, in 179 families.

References 

Populated places in Kermanshah County